The discography of Reuben.

Discography

Albums
Racecar Is Racecar Backwards – June 2004 – #88
Very Fast Very Dangerous – September 2005 – #87
In Nothing We Trust – 25 June 2007 – #102

Compilations
We Should Have Gone To University – July 2009

EPs
Pilot EP – January 2001
TwoByThree EP – March 2008

Demos
Me Vs. You – 1998 – As 'Angel'
Death of a Star – 1999 – As 'Angel'
Betrayed Demo – 1999 – As 'Angel'
Hand Over Fist – 2000 – As 'Angel'

Singles

DVD
What Happens in Aldershot Stays in Aldershot
Recorded: January–December 2006
Released: 19 March 2007
Label: Hideous Records
Contains complete footage of the London Mean Fiddler, 2006 show and an hour-long documentary film.

Appearances on compilations

References

External links
Official site
Hideous Records site

Discographies of British artists
Heavy metal group discographies
Post-hardcore group discographies